The Maine Coon is a large domesticated cat breed. It is one of the oldest natural breeds in North America. The breed originated in the U.S. state of Maine, where it is the official state cat.

The Maine Coon is a large and social cat, which could be the reason why it has a reputation of being referred to as "the gentle giant." The Maine Coon is predominantly known for its size and dense coat of fur which helps the large feline to survive in the harsh climate of Maine. The Maine Coon is often cited as having "dog-like" characteristics. 

Due to the large size of this feline, professionals have noticed certain health problems arising in the breed, including feline hypertrophic cardiomyopathy and hip dysplasia.

History 
The Maine Coon is one of the largest domesticated cats. It has a distinctive physical appearance and valuable hunting skills. The breed was popular in cat shows in the late 19th century, but its existence became threatened when long-haired breeds from overseas were introduced in the early 20th century. The Maine Coon has since made a comeback, in 2020 becoming the third most popular pedigree cat breed in the world.

Origin 
The ancestral origins of the Maine Coon are unknown. Some speculate that they are descended from Norwegian forest cats or Siberian forest cats, which may have been brought to New England by settlers.

There are also folk tales around their origin. One story involves Marie Antoinette, the Queen of France who was executed in 1793. The story goes that before her death, Antoinette attempted to escape France with the help of Captain Samuel Clough. She loaded Clough's ship with her most prized possessions, including six of her favorite Turkish Angora or possibly Siberian cats. Although she did not make it to the United States, all of her pets managed to reach the shore of Wiscasset, Maine, safely, where they bred with other short-haired breeds and developed into the modern breed of the Maine Coon.

Cat shows and popularity 

The first mention of Maine Coon cats in a literary work was in 1861, in Frances Simpson's The Book of the Cat (1903). F.R. Pierce, who owned several Maine Coons, wrote a chapter about the breed. During the late 1860s, farmers located in Maine told stories about their cats and held the "Maine State Champion Coon Cat" contest at the local Skowhegan Fair.

In 1895, a dozen Maine Coons were entered into a show in Boston. On 8 May 1895, the first North American cat show was hosted at Madison Square Garden in New York City. A female Maine Coon brown tabby, named Cosey, was entered into the show. Owned by Mrs. Fred Brown, Cosey won the silver collar and medal and was named Best in Show. The silver collar was purchased by the Cat Fanciers' Association (CFA) Foundation with the help of a donation from the National Capital Cat Show. The collar is housed at the CFA Central Office in the Jean Baker Rose Memorial Library.

In the early 20th century, the Maine Coon's popularity began to decline with the introduction of other long-haired breeds, such as the Persian, which originated in the Middle East. The last recorded win by a Maine Coon in a national cat show for over 40 years was in 1911 at a show in Portland, Oregon. The breed was rarely seen after that. The decline was so severe that the breed was declared extinct in the 1950s, although this declaration was considered to be exaggerated and reported prematurely at the time. The Central Maine Cat Club (CMCC) was created in the early 1950s by Ethylin Whittemore, Alta Smith, and Ruby Dyer in an attempt to increase the popularity of the Maine Coon. For 11 years, the CMCC held cat shows and hosted exhibitions of photographs of the breed and is noted for creating the first written breed standards for the Maine Coon.

The Maine Coon was denied provisional breed status—one of the three steps required for a breed not yet recognized by the CFA to be able to compete in championship competitions—by the CFA three times, which led to the formation of the Maine Coon Cat Club in 1973. The breed was accepted by the CFA under provisional status on May 1, 1975, and was approved for championship status on May 1, 1976. The next couple of decades saw a rise in popularity of the Maine Coon, with championship victories and an increase in national rankings. In 1985, the state of Maine announced that the breed would be named the official state cat. Today the Maine Coon is the third most popular cat breed, according to the number of kittens registered with the CFA.

Description 
The Maine Coon is a large and sociable cat characterized by a prominent ruff along its chest, robust bone structure, strong jawline, rectangular body shape, an uneven two-layered coat with longer guard hairs over a silky satin undercoat, and a long, bushy tail. With the 1970s revival of the interest in the breed, Maine Coon cats were noted to show an increased incidence of polydactylism compared to other breeds. Subsequently, breeders of show-standard cats were advised to regard this variation as undesirable and to offer affected kittens as household pets. The trait later became separately certified by some organizations, like The International Cat Association (TICA). Meanwhile, in increasing numbers of cat fancy competitions, the trait is no longer marked down.

Markings 
The Maine Coon is a long- or medium-haired cat. The coat is soft and silky, although texture may vary with coat color. The length is shorter on the head and shoulders and longer on the stomach and flanks, with some cats having a leonine ruff around their neck. Minimal grooming is required for the breed compared to other long-haired breeds, as their coat is mostly self-maintaining owing to a light-density undercoat. The coat is subject to seasonal variation, with the fur being thicker in the winter and thinner during the summer.

Maine Coons can have any  colors that other cats have. Colors indicating crossbreeding, such as chocolate, lavender, the Siamese pointed patterns or the "ticked" patterns, are not accepted by some breed standards. This is not universal; the ticked pattern, for example, is accepted by TICA and CFA. The most common pattern seen in the breed is brown tabby. All eye colors are accepted under breed standards, with the exception of blue or odd-eyes, i.e. heterochromia iridium, or two eyes of different colors, in cats possessing coat colors other than white.

Habits 

Maine Coons have several physical adaptations for survival in harsh winter climates. Their dense water-resistant fur is longer and shaggier on their underside and rear for extra protection when they are walking or sitting on top of wet surfaces of snow or ice. Their long and bushy raccoon-like tail is resistant to sinking in snow, and can be curled around their face and shoulders for warmth and protection from wind and blowing snow. It can even be curled around their backside like an insulated seat cushion when sitting down on a frozen surface. Large paws, and especially the extra-large paws of polydactyl Maine Coons, facilitate walking on snow and are often compared to snowshoes. Long tufts of fur growing between their toes help keep the toes warm and further aid walking on snow by giving the paws additional structure without significant extra weight. Heavily furred ears with extra long tufts of fur growing from inside can keep warm more easily.

Personality 
Maine Coons are known as the "gentle giants" and possess above-average intelligence, making them relatively easy to train. They are known for being loyal to their family and cautious—but not mean—around strangers, but are independent and not clingy. The Maine Coon is generally not known for being a "lap cat," but their gentle disposition makes the breed relaxed around dogs, other cats, and children. Many Maine Coons have a fascination with water and some speculate that this personality trait comes from their ancestors, who were aboard ships for much of their lives. Maine Coons are also well known for being very vocal cats. They are known for their frequent yowling or howling, trilling, chirping, and making other loud vocalizations.

Size 

The Maine Coon was considered the largest breed of domestic cat until the introduction of the Savannah cat in the mid 1980s, and is still the largest non-hybrid breed. The body is solid and muscular, which is necessary for supporting their weight, and the chest is broad. Maine Coons possess a rectangular body shape and are slow to physically mature; their full size is normally not reached until they are three to five years old, while other cats take about one year.

Stewie died on February 4, 2013, from cancer at his home in Reno, Nevada, at age 8. As of 2015 the living record-holder for "Longest Cat" is "Ludo", measuring 46.59 in (118.33 cm). He lives in Wakefield, England, in the United Kingdom. 
Large Maine Coons can overlap in length with Eurasian lynxes, although with a much lighter build and lower height.

Diet 
Maine Coon cats generally can eat the same food as other types of cats, although their high energy expenditure can mean that they need a larger-than-average diet.

Health 

Pet insurance data obtained from a study during years 2003–2006 in Sweden puts the median lifespan of the Maine Coon at > 12.5 years. 74% lived to 10 years or more and 54% lived to 12.5 years or more. Maine Coons are generally a healthy and hardy breed that is adapted to survive the challenging climate of New England. The most severe threat is feline hypertrophic cardiomyopathy (HCM), the most common heart disease seen in cats, whether purebred or not. In Maine Coons, it is thought to be inherited as an autosomal dominant trait. Middle-aged to older cats and males are thought to be predisposed to the disease. HCM is a progressive disease and can result in heart failure, paralysis of the hind legs due to clot embolization originating in the heart, and sudden death.

A specific mutation that causes HCM, for which testing services are offered, is seen in Maine Coons. Of all the Maine Coons tested for the MyBPC mutation at the Veterinary Cardiac Genetics Lab at the College of Veterinary Medicine at Washington State University, approximately one-third tested positive. Not all cats that test positive will have clinical signs of the disease, and some Maine Coon cats with clinical evidence of hypertrophic cardiomyopathy test negative for this mutation, strongly suggesting that a second mutation exists in the breed. The HCM prevalence was found to be 10.1% (95% CI 5.8 -14.3% ) in this study. Early growth and nutrition, larger body size, and obesity may be environmental modifiers of genetic predisposition to HCM.

Another potential health problem is spinal muscular atrophy (SMA), another genetically inherited disease that causes the loss of the spinal-cord neurons which activate the skeletal muscles of the trunk and limbs. Symptoms are normally seen within 3–4 months of age and result in muscle atrophy, muscle weakness, and a shortened lifespan. A test is offered to detect the genes responsible for SMA.

Maine Coons also seem to be predisposed to develop entropion, mainly on the lateral aspect of the eyelids, which can lead to corneal irritation and ulceration, and may require surgery. 

Hip dysplasia is an abnormality of the hip joint which can cause crippling lameness and arthritis. The cats most commonly affected with hip dysplasia tend to be males of the larger, big-boned breeds such as Persians and Maine Coons. The relatively smaller size and weight of cats frequently results in symptoms that are less pronounced. X-rays submitted to the Orthopedic Foundation for Animals (OFA) between 1974 and 2011 indicates that 24.3% of Maine Coons in the database were dysplastic. The Maine Coon is the only cat breed listed in the database. The hip dysplasia registry (public and private) collected by OFA through April 2015 also showed that there were 2,732 cats that suffered from hip dysplasia, of which 2,708 (99.1%) were Maine Coons. Dysplasia was more severe in bilateral than unilateral cases and with increasing age.

Polycystic kidney disease (PKD) is an inherited condition in cats that causes multiple cysts (pockets of fluid) to form in the kidneys. These cysts are present from birth. Initially, they are very small, but they grow larger over time and may eventually disrupt kidney function, resulting in kidney failure. While renal cysts are observed with a low incidence in Maine Coons, PKD appears to be a misnomer in this particular breed. In a recent study spanning 8 years, renal cysts were documented by ultrasound in 7 of 187 healthy Maine Coons enrolled in a pre-breeding screening programme. The cysts were mostly single and unilateral (6/7, 85.7%) small (mean 3.6 mm in diameter) and located at the corticomedullary junction (4/6, 66.7%), thus different in size, number, and location from those observed in Persian-related breeds. In the same study, not only did all six Maine Coon cats with renal cysts test negative for the PKD1 mutation, proving the disease in these cats to be unrelated to the PKD observed in Persians and related breeds, but gene sequencing of these cats failed to demonstrate any common genetic sequences. 'Maine Coon PKD' thus appears to represent a form of juvenile nephropathy other than AD-PKD.

Many of the original Maine Coon cats that inhabited the New England area possessed a trait known as polydactylism (having one or more extra toes on a paw). Polydactylism is rarely, if ever, seen in Maine Coons in the show ring, since it is not allowed by competition standards. The gene for polydactylism is a simple autosomal dominant gene, which has shown to pose a threat to the cat's health. The polydactylism are genetic problems which are not encouraged for breeding.  Polydactyly in Maine Coon cats is characterised by broad phenotypic diversity. Polydactyly not only affects digit number and conformation, but also carpus and tarsus conformation. The trait was almost eradicated from the breed due to the fact that it was an automatic disqualifier in show rings. Some private organizations and breeders were created in order to preserve polydactylism in Maine Coon cats.

See also

References

Further reading 

 
 
 

Cat breeds
Cat breeds originating in the United States
Linebred animals
Maine culture
Natural cat breeds